Érik Alan Pimentel Benavides (born 15 May 1990), also known as El Puma, is a Mexican professional footballer who plays as a centre-back for USL Championship club Rio Grande Valley.

Club career
A homegrown player, Pimentel debuted in the Apertura 2011 tournament on 24 July 2011 as a starter in a match against Querétaro in which América won 2–1 at the Estadio Azteca.

On 27 April 2021, Pimentel joined USL Championship side Rio Grande Valley FC ahead of the 2021 season.

Honours
América
Liga MX: Apertura 2014 
CONCACAF Champions League: 2014–15, 2015–16

References

External links
 
 América Profile
 
 

1990 births
Living people
Mexican expatriate footballers
Club América footballers
Atlante F.C. footballers
Club Puebla players
Liga MX players
Liga Nacional de Fútbol de Guatemala players
Footballers from the State of Mexico
People from Coacalco de Berriozábal
Association football defenders
Mexican expatriate sportspeople in Guatemala
Expatriate footballers in Guatemala
Rio Grande Valley FC Toros players
Expatriate soccer players in the United States
Mexican expatriate sportspeople in the United States
Mexican footballers